Cole Creek is a stream in Howard County in the U.S. state of Missouri. It is a tributary of Hungry Mother Creek.

Cole Creek was named after nearby Coles Fort.

See also
List of rivers of Missouri

References

Rivers of Howard County, Missouri
Rivers of Missouri